Master Chief may refer to:
Master chief petty officer, a military enlisted rate in the United States Navy and Coast Guard
Master Chief Petty Officer of the Coast Guard, a unique non-commissioned rank and position in the United States Coast Guard
Master Chief Petty Officer of the Navy, a unique non-commissioned rank of the United States Navy
Master Chief Musician
Master Chief Hospital Corpsman
Master Chief (Halo), a character from the Halo series

See also
Master Chef (disambiguation)